Allegiant Air (usually shortened to Allegiant) is an ultra low-cost U.S. carrier that operates scheduled and charter flights. It is a major air carrier, the fourteenth-largest commercial airline in North America.

Allegiant was founded in 1997 and is wholly owned by Allegiant Travel Company, a publicly traded company with 4,000 employees and over US$2.6 billion market capitalization . The corporate headquarters are in Summerlin, Nevada, a suburb of Las Vegas.

History

Establishment
Allegiant Air was founded in January 1997 by Mitch Allee (owner, CEO), Jim Patterson (president) and Dave Beadle (chief pilot) under the name WestJet Express. After losing a trademark dispute with Westjet Air Center of Rapid City, South Dakota, and recognizing the name's similarity to WestJet Airlines of Calgary, Alberta, the airline adopted the name Allegiant Air and received FAA and US DOT certification for scheduled and charter domestic operations on June 19, 1998. The airline also has authority for charter service to Canada and Mexico.

1990s 
Scheduled service began on October 15, 1998 between Las Vegas and the airline's original hub in Fresno, California at the Fresno Yosemite International Airport with Douglas DC-9-21 and McDonnell Douglas DC-9-51 jetliners. During the second half of 1999, the airline was operating nonstop flights between Fresno and Las Vegas, Burbank and Lake Tahoe, and Las Vegas and Lake Tahoe as well as flying one-stop direct service between Fresno and Lake Tahoe via Las Vegas.

2000s 
Allegiant Air opened a small hub in Long Beach, California (LGB) and in 2000 was operating nonstop flights to Fresno and Las Vegas in addition to Fresno-Las Vegas nonstop service. Later in 2000, Allegiant continued to expand and was operating the only nonstop jet service between Lake Tahoe Airport and Long Beach Airport in addition to operating new flights into Portland, Oregon and Reno with Portland-Reno and Reno-Fresno nonstops and direct one-stop service between Portland and Fresno via Reno.

Citing higher fuel costs as a major factor, Allegiant filed for Chapter 11 bankruptcy protection in 2000. The bankruptcy allowed Maurice J. Gallagher Jr., one of the airline's major creditors, to gain control of the business. A veteran leader of low-cost airlines, Gallagher had worked with WestAir and was one of the founders of ValuJet Airlines. In June 2001, Gallagher restructured Allegiant to a low-cost model, focusing on smaller markets that larger airlines did not serve with mainline aircraft. Allegiant's headquarters and operations were also moved to Las Vegas.

In the fall of 2001, Allegiant exited bankruptcy and the case was officially closed in early 2002. In March 2002, Allegiant entered into a long-term contract with Harrah's to provide charter services to its casinos in Laughlin and Reno, Nevada. At the same time, the airline acquired its first McDonnell Douglas MD-80 jetliner. From 2002 through 2004, the airline developed its scheduled-service business model. By 2004, Allegiant was flying from 13 small cities to Las Vegas and offering bundled air and hotel packages.

In May 2005, the airline's holding company, Allegiant Travel, completed a private equity placement worth $39.5 million. In November 2006, Allegiant filed a registration statement with the Securities and Exchange Commission in anticipation of a planned initial public offering of its Common Stock. It raised $94.5 million in equity capital with 5.75 million shares worth $18 each. It began trading on the NASDAQ Stock Market under the ticker symbol "ALGT" in December 2006.

Also in 2006, the airline had a fleet of 21 MD-80s and was flying non-stop to and from 40 small cities. Most of those flights went to and from the hubs of Las Vegas or Orlando/Sanford, Florida. In October 2007, Allegiant opened a fourth focus city and operations base at Phoenix-Mesa, Arizona, connecting 13 cities already served by Allegiant and one new city to the Phoenix metropolitan area. The Mesa airport joined Las Vegas, Orlando, and Tampa/St. Petersburg as major hubs for the airline. At the time, Allegiant maintained a fleet of 32 planes going to 53 destinations in total. The Mesa airport announced a  expansion in August 2008, which increased the number of gates from two to four and allowed Allegiant to triple the number of flights from Phoenix.

On November 14, 2007, Allegiant opened its fifth focus city and operations base at Fort Lauderdale, connecting other Allegiant cities to South Florida.In January 2008, Allegiant opened its sixth base at Bellingham, Washington. Expansion in Bellingham has been largely driven by its proximity to Greater Vancouver, British Columbia.

2010s

In January 2010, the airline celebrated its one-millionth passenger to fly out of Phoenix-Mesa Gateway Airport. Allegiant's parent company also announced that it had purchased 18 additional used MD-80 aircraft from Scandinavian Airlines. In February 2010, Allegiant opened its ninth base at Grand Rapids' Gerald R. Ford International Airport in Michigan. The airline based two McDonnell Douglas MD-80 aircraft in Grand Rapids, but ended their airport's status in 2011. The airline continues to fly out of Grand Rapids in a reduced capacity.

On July 1, 2010, Allegiant returned to Long Beach Airport (LGB) in Long Beach, California, having previously served LGB with DC-9 jets with nonstop flights to Las Vegas (LAS) and Lake Tahoe (TVL) in 2000. The airline also intended to fly from Bellingham International Airport and Stockton several times a week; however, there is no service at present flown between these two cities, although Allegiant continues to serve Stockton with flights to Las Vegas, Phoenix/Mesa and San Diego. In November 2011, Allegiant closed its Long Beach facility and consolidated all Los Angeles area flights at Los Angeles International (LAX).

In March 2010, Allegiant purchased six used Boeing 757-200 jetliners as part of plans to begin flights to Hawaii, with deliveries from early 2010 to the fourth quarter of 2011. It gained the approval for type with the FAA in July 2011, and then worked with the FAA to obtain the appropriate ETOPS rating in order to be able to serve Hawaii. Allegiant no longer operates nonstop service to Honolulu from Las Vegas.

In mid-2015, a rash of midair breakdowns drew federal scrutiny. "Before the night was finished on June 25, 2015, five Allegiant flights had been interrupted in four hours, all because different planes had failed in midair," reported the Tampa Bay Times. Since October 2015, the Federal Aviation Administration has kept Allegiant under close supervision.

In July 2015, Allegiant Air announced that bases would be established at the Asheville Regional Airport and Cincinnati/Northern Kentucky International Airport.

In August 2017, Allegiant announced that a new base would be established at the Indianapolis International Airport. The base began operations in early 2018. Throughout 2017, the airline flew 12 million passengers on its 99 planes to 120 destinations from California to Florida. In February 2018, Allegiant also announced that a new base would be established at the Destin–Fort Walton Beach Airport. In June 2018, Allegiant added another base at McGhee Tyson Airport in Knoxville, Tennessee. In January 2019, Allegiant announced that it would be adding another base at Gerald R. Ford International Airport in Grand Rapids, Michigan. Allegiant announced that they would be adding an additional base at Des Moines International Airport in Des Moines, Iowa by November 2019.

2020s 
On February 12, 2021, Allegiant launched flights to John Wayne Airport with 8 initial destinations including Boise, Grand Junction, Las Vegas, Medford, Missoula, Provo, Reno/Tahoe, and Spokane.

On August 10, 2021, Allegiant announced that they would be opening 2 more operating bases at Appleton International Airport and Bishop International Airport beginning March 2022.

On October 7, 2021, Allegiant began serving non-stop flights from Minneapolis-St. Paul International Airport to Asheville, North Carolina, and Palm Beach, Florida. They would later serve 5 more, including Punta Gorda, Florida, Destin-Fort Walton Beach, Florida, and Phoenix-Mesa, Arizona. They serve all of these routes using Airbus 320 aircraft. The same year it entered into an joint venture with Viva Aerobus to expand routes between the United States and Mexico.

Corporate affairs

Ownership and structure
Allegiant Air is a wholly owned subsidiary of its holding company, Allegiant Travel Company, which is publicly traded under NASDAQ: ALGT. Allegiant Travel Company is also the parent company of Allegiant Vacations.

Business trends
The key trends for the Allegiant Travel Company (including its consolidated subsidiaries) are (years ending December 31):

Headquarters
The corporate headquarters are in Summerlin, Nevada, a master-planned community in suburban Las Vegas, Nevada.

Business model
Allegiant aims primarily to serve leisure travelers, particularly those in colder northern climates, going to warm-weather tourist destinations such as Punta Gorda, Tampa Bay, Las Vegas, Orlando, Los Angeles, and Phoenix. Allegiant also serves smaller destinations that have few direct flights by major carriers. Many of the airline's markets, such as Peoria, Illinois, are served only by commuter service requiring a connection at an airline hub. Allegiant tends to fly routes which avoid competition from other airlines, with only 18% of its 518 routes as of early 2020 also flown nonstop by other airlines.

To keep ticket prices relatively low, Allegiant offers a lower frequency of flights and no on-board amenities such free soft drinks or entertainment. It also does not offer any connecting services, with customers only able to purchase non-stop itineraries on its website.

It prefers to use smaller, secondary airports when those facilities charge smaller fees, such as Orlando Sanford International Airport and Phoenix-Mesa Gateway Airport, where Allegiant is now the only commercial carrier with year-round service. However, since 2015, Allegiant has been growing at major airports, such as Cincinnati, Denver, Indianapolis, Los Angeles, Memphis, Newark, Raleigh–Durham, and San Antonio.

Allegiant flies into many major vacation destination airports, including Las Vegas and Fort Lauderdale–Hollywood.

In June 2013, Allegiant deviated from this strategy with plans to compete with Southwest Airlines by offering direct flights between Las Vegas and Austin, a medium-sized hub served by 10 carriers with non-stop routes to over 40 destinations. The airline also flies less frequently compared to the major airlines, operating routes two or three times per week. That requires fewer crews and allows less time-pressured aircraft maintenance.

Although it does not fly to Canada, Allegiant advertises in the country and flies from about a dozen small airports near the Canada–U.S. border. Many of its customers at airports such as Bellingham, Washington (BLI) and Plattsburgh, New York (PBG) are Canadians, who save money on airfare by crossing the border to the U.S. and flying domestic routes from U.S. airports.

In February 2011, Allegiant proposed to sell two types of tickets to passengers: advance tickets at a fixed higher rate and time-of-departure tickets with lower prices but with additional fees based on the price of aviation fuel. In 2012, the U.S. Department of Transportation banned the practice as part of wider regulations that also require taxes and fees to be included in airfares. Allegiant, along with Spirit Airlines and Southwest Airlines, sued the USDOT to overturn these new rules. The United States Court of Appeals for the District of Columbia Circuit ruled in favor of the USDOT on 24 July 2012 and the US Supreme Court denied certiorari on 1 April 2013.

Ancillary revenue
Like Ryanair, the low-cost airline founded by Tony Ryan, whose family has also have invested in Allegiant, the airline seeks ancillary revenue to supplement ticket revenue.
These ancillary fees include those for checking luggage, carrying on luggage (other than a small personal item), buying food and drinks on board, obtaining advance seat assignments, and more. Allegiant CEO Maurice Gallagher said in 2009, "We collect $110 from you at the end of your trip. If I tried to charge you $110 up front, you wouldn't pay it. But if I sell you a $75 ticket and you self-select the rest, you will."

Allegiant also earns commissions by offering hotel rooms, car rentals and admission to tourist attractions on its website. It sells package vacations under the brand name Allegiant Vacations. The company has arrangements with 34 hotels in Las Vegas and 21 in the Orlando and Daytona Beach, Florida, areas. In 2008, the airline sold 400,000 hotel room nights. Commissions on hotel and rental car packages are up to one-third of the airline's revenue.

In 2009, ancillary revenues were $33.35 per passenger.

Charter flights
Allegiant's air charter operation contributed 7% of its revenue in 2009.

In March 2011, Allegiant took over charter service to Wendover Airport for Peppermill Casinos, Inc. to shuttle customers to Peppermill's three casinos in West Wendover, Nevada; the Montego Bay Resort, the Rainbow Wendover and the Peppermill Wendover. Allegiant based one 150-seat, MD-80 series jet aircraft in Wendover and more than 20 employees, including maintenance, flight crews and station personnel.

Allegiant also transports firefighters for the United States Forest Service as well as college basketball teams. Allegiant had a contract to supply charter flights from Miami to four cities in Cuba beginning June 2009. One aircraft was committed to the contract. The contract was for fixed-fee flying, meaning all the airline was required to do was provide the dry aircraft and the flight crew. The contractor was responsible for all other costs including fuel. However, Allegiant ended this service in August 2009.

The company had charter contracts with Caesars Entertainment to ferry customers to Caesars casino properties through Reno-Tahoe International Airport, Laughlin/Bullhead International Airport and Tunica Municipal Airport. These contracts ended in December 2012 when Caesars Entertainment signed a new contract with Republic Airways to provide the charter service to Caesars properties in Atlantic City, New Jersey, Tunica, Mississippi, and Laughlin, Nevada.

Sponsorships 
In July 2018, Allegiant became the official airline of Minor League Baseball (MiLB). In September of the same year, Allegiant partnered with the National Hockey League's Vegas Golden Knights as the "Official Domestic Airline Partner". On June 3, 2019, soccer club FC Cincinnati announced that they had entered a multiple-year agreement with Allegiant making them the club's official airline partner. The agreement includes club and stadium assets, game-day experience and more. Allegiant also offers its popular Fan Flyaway Program to FCC fans. FCC's TQL Stadium also has an entry gate named after the airline. On August 5, 2019, Allegiant inked a 20-year deal with the Las Vegas Raiders of the National Football League (NFL) for the naming rights to the team's new home, Allegiant Stadium, in Paradise, Nevada. Allegiant is also a main sponsor with GMS Racing in the NASCAR Xfinity Series and the NASCAR Gander Outdoors Truck Series. In January 2020, Allegiant became the official airline of the Indianapolis Colts.

Costs
Part of the airline's business model includes the purchase of jets second hand or at steep discounts. While used aircraft are less fuel-efficient than newer planes, Allegiant reported that it purchased and refurbished McDonnell Douglas MD-80 jets for as little as $4 million, one-tenth the cost compared to a new Boeing 737.

Given the low initial purchase price, Allegiant is able to operate its aircraft at a lower duty cycle (seven flight hours per day on average versus 13 hours per day at JetBlue Airways), which helps keep labor costs lower. Allegiant schedules their crew members so that they typically return to their domicile at the end of the day, avoiding the expense of hotel rooms.

The airline also seeks to maintain a low operating cost at airports. For example, Allegiant rents ticket counters on an hourly basis and in Chattanooga, Tennessee, and Springfield, Missouri, many duties are handled by airport employees contracted to Allegiant.

Allegiant maintains control over pricing by offering flights exclusively through its website, which also sells ancillary products. It has no toll-free phone number and does sell tickets through internet travel agencies.

Branding
Allegiant Air's livery features a bright sunburst design on the tail, emphasizing the airline's "sun" destinations. A similar livery is used by Jet2.com on aircraft which carry the Jet2holidays livery, the only difference being the airline name on the aircraft. The livery was created for the airline by Tiami Designs, Atlanta, Georgia.

Controversy

Workers' right to organize
Flight attendants at the carrier voted to organize their workgroup under the Transport Workers Union of America in December 2010, citing scheduling concerns among other issues in their work rules, and the airline's pilots elected to vote on whether to join the International Brotherhood of Teamsters in July 2012. In August 2012, the pilots voted to organize and joined the Teamsters. Allegiant's chairman and CEO, Maurice J. Gallagher Jr., has been critical of the unionization of airline employees, and has stated, "Unionization is one of those things that clogs the arteries and makes you less quick and not as nimble as you need to be on top of your game... In this industry and others that are heavily unionized, you ultimately end up with bankruptcy as the primary driver."

Safety concerns over former MD-80 fleet

Allegiant Air has been closely monitored by the FAA due to many emergency landings and aborted takeoffs. ABC interviewed a former Allegiant mechanic, who said "Dedicated steps were not being performed with maintenance manuals or even with general practices, before an aircraft is released." A survey found that 46 of the company's 86 aircraft had made emergency landings, all of which involved MD-80s. The average age of Allegiant's MD-80 fleet was 29 years, compared to less than 13 years for its Airbus fleet.  all of its MD-80s have been replaced by newer Airbus A320 family aircraft.

In May 2016, the FAA confirmed they moved up a regularly scheduled five-year inspection. Allegiant Air proclaims the FAA gave them a clean bill of health after the 2016 audit.

In November 2016 the Tampa Bay Times noted that Allegiant's planes were four times more likely to have in-flight failures than other major US airlines, and a 60 Minutes report by CBS News in 2018 continued to investigate the issues. Public records cited in the investigation found that the airline had more than 100 serious mechanical incidents between January 1, 2016, and October 31, 2017, including "mid-air engine failures, smoke and fumes in the cabin, rapid descents, flight control malfunctions, hydraulic leaks and aborted takeoffs." Other public records further revealed that Allegiant aircraft, on average, were nearly three and a half times more likely to have mid-air breakdowns than American, United, Delta, JetBlue and Spirit. Allegiant responded to the investigation stating that many of the issues occurred on their older MD-80 model aircraft which have since been replaced with Airbus A320, and also defended its safety record, citing the 2016 FAA audit, which found the company's safety issues "minor" and "non-systemic."

Destinations

As of December 2021, Allegiant offers service to 133 destinations throughout the United States, mostly to smaller non-hub regional airports and all usually only a few times each week. It chooses its routes after calculating expected costs and revenue and adds or ends service to particular destinations as demand warrants.

Top domestic markets

Fleet

Current fleet

As of February 2023, the Allegiant fleet consisted of the following aircraft:

Fleet strategy
Allegiant Air is known in the aviation industry for acquiring aircraft at the lowest costs it can find. Since its inception, Allegiant has primarily purchased second-hand, used aircraft. However, in recent years, it has purchased some new aircraft when it could negotiate particularly low prices.

Used aircraft, while significantly less fuel efficient, can be purchased and refurbished at much lower cost. The fuel costs are also less of a problem because of Allegiant's business model of operating aircraft at relatively low duty cycles.

At the start of operations in the late 1990s, Allegiant purchased McDonnell Douglas DC-9 jets, which it operated until 2002, when they were replaced by the McDonnell Douglas MD-80.

Starting in 2010, Allegiant purchased six Boeing 757-200 aircraft from Thomson Airways for flights to Hawaii. Over the next few years the airline experimented operating service from several of its cities. Ultimately, Allegiant discontinued the service and slowly disposed of the planes rather than incur the expense of performing comprehensive D checks on the aging planes.

In 2012, Allegiant announced that it would shift its primary aircraft from the MD-80 to the Airbus A320 family. A total of 35 Airbus A319-100 aircraft in a high-density seating configuration, fitted with four overwing exits, were purchased from easyJet and Cebu Pacific. In 2013, the airline started adding the Airbus A320-200 to its fleet, purchasing used aircraft from Iberia and Philippine Airlines, and leasing other aircraft.

Allegiant purchased its first new aircraft, buying 13 A320s direct from Airbus, taking advantage of lower prices for an older model as the aircraft manufacturer prepared to begin production of the Airbus A320neo. These new aircraft would have fuel-efficient sharklets, and would seat 186 passengers, an increase over the 177 seats in the rest of the Allegiant A320 fleet, due to a smaller lavatory.

On October 31, 2017, the final 757 was retired from service, and in November 2018, the last MD-80s operated by Allegiant were retired.

Allegiant purchased additional new aircraft in January 2022, this time buying 50 Boeing 737 MAX aircraft, taking advantage of low prices as other airlines cancelled their orders in the wake of the nearly two year grounding of the type.

Historical fleet

Incidents and accidents 
On March 29, 2007, Allegiant Air Flight 758, a McDonnell Douglas MD-83, experienced a hydraulic failure that prevented the nosegear from deploying on final approach to Orlando Sanford International Airport. The aircraft landed safely with only one minor injury during evacuation among the 157 passengers and crew. The plane suffered substantial damage, but it was repaired and placed back into service.
On July 23, 2015, an Allegiant aircraft attempted to fly to Hector International Airport in Fargo, North Dakota, which was at the time within a temporary flight restriction due to a rehearsal by the Blue Angels flight team for an upcoming air show. The pilots then declared a fuel emergency, stating, "Yeah, listen, we're bingo [empty] fuel here in about probably three to four minutes and I got to come in and land." The pilots were scolded by the airport's tower, who said, "Your company...should have been aware of this for a number of months," regarding the airspace restrictions. The pilots flying the aircraft were, at the time, the airline's vice president of flight operations and its director of flight safety.

See also 
 Air transportation in the United States

References

External links

 
 

1997 establishments in Nevada
Airlines established in 1997
Companies based in Enterprise, Nevada
Companies listed on the Nasdaq
Low-cost carriers
Companies that filed for Chapter 11 bankruptcy in 2000
2006 initial public offerings
Airlines based in Nevada
American companies established in 1997